The Adcox 1-A was a two-seat open-cockpit biplane built by the students of the US Adcox Aviation Trade School in 1929. Only a single example was constructed.

Biplanes
Single-engined tractor aircraft
1-A
1920s United States sport aircraft